Huggins Township is a township in Gentry County, in the U.S. state of Missouri.

Huggins Township has the name of John Huggins, an early settler.

References

Townships in Missouri
Townships in Gentry County, Missouri